The eastern small-toothed rat (Macruromys major) is a species of rodent in the family Muridae.
It is found in West Papua, Indonesia and Papua New Guinea.

References

Macruromys
Rodents of Papua New Guinea
Mammals of Western New Guinea
Mammals described in 1935
Taxonomy articles created by Polbot
Endemic fauna of New Guinea
Taxa named by Hans Rümmler
Rodents of New Guinea